Savat Mazi Ladki (transl. My Dear Co-Wife) is a 1993 Indian Marathi-language comedy-drama film directed and produced by Smita Talwalkar. The film stars Mohan Joshi, Neena Kulkarni, Varsha Usgaonkar, Prashant Damle, and Ramesh Bhatkar in lead roles. The story revolves around Seema (Kulkarni), a mature housewife who gets her husband Madhu (Joshi) "remarried" to his assistant Beena (Usgaonkar) after learning about their love affair. Apart from this, Beena is loved by her colleague Dinesh (Damle) while Madhu develops a misunderstanding that Seema is also having an extramarital affair with his friend Pradeep (Bhatkar).

Plot 

Dr. Madhukar Hirve (Mohan Joshi), also known as Madhu, is a well-known surgeon who owns a local hospital. His is married to Seema Hirve (Neena Kulkarni), a responsible and mature housewife who believes that her husband does not engage in other women. They have two daughters who live with Seema's parents. Madhu's colleague Dr. Dinesh Kirtikar (Prashant Damle) is an anesthetist with a good sense of humor while his childhood friend Pradeep Bhave (Ramesh Bhatkar) runs a hotel. Soon, Dr. Beena Karnik (Varsha Usgaonkar), a beautiful young girl, joins as Madhu's assistant in his hospital. Madhu is instantly attracted to her during her tenure and tries to befriend her. However, she is under depression after breaking up with her boyfriend and lacks happiness. They subsequently travel to Mahabaleshwar for a conference where Madhu dislikes Beena's closeness to Dinesh who is in love with her too. He thus asks her to forget her grief and start a new life. He even buys sarees and earrings for her and she slowly begins to like his company. After returning to Pune, Madhu buys a night gown for Beena as it has the alphabet "B" and hides it in his house. However, he is forced to gift it to Seema after she finds it hidden in the house and lies to her that it is from the "Butterfly" company. When Seema goes to her parents' house to visit their daughters, Madhu invites Beena to his house but her earrings are lost on the couch. As Seema returns home early, Madhu decides to go and trick her in order to find the earrings. However, Seema ends up finding Beena's earrings and coming to know about the sarees Madhu had bought for her in Mahabaleshwar. She even discovers that the night gown was actually for Beena after she buys another night gown with the alphabet "S" for herself from the same shop. She also learns that Madhu has paid for the flat booked by Beena in "Ajay Constructions". Madhu is shell-shocked upon learning that Seema knows each and every thing of his extramarital affair with Beena. 

The next day, a hurt and angry Seema imagines her neighbours gossiping about Madhu's affair at her house. Seema then declares her shocking decision to Madhu that with her own consent, he should "remarry" Beena in order to help her gain respect and that she should now manage the home as a housewife. A shocked Madhu reluctantly agrees to marry Beena who is also delighted at Seema's decision, much to Dinesh's distraught. Seema brings Beena home as her co-wife and showers her love and affection on her while planning to teach Madhu a lesson. Having retired from her duty, Seema now wears fashionable clothes and spends the whole day outdoor while Beena is forced to complete all the daily household chores. Meanwhile, Madhu dislikes his life as both his wives do not show their love for him. He is even unable to spend time with Beena individually as his each plan is cleverly interrupted by Seema, much to Dinesh's delight. Beena has also lost interest in Madhu as he never proposed marriage to her himself but they got married only because of Seema's wish. She has thus realised that he is not the right life partner for her. Further, Dinesh and Seema encourage Beena to start working in the hospital with Madhu again. Meanwhile, Pradeep happens to see Seema in a gym during her classes and falls in love with her, unaware that she is Madhu's wife. This causes Madhu to develop a misunderstanding that Seema is already having an extramarital affair with Pradeep due to further coincidental incidents between the two as well. He tries to confront both Pradeep and Seema over their love for each other but in vain. Later, Madhu miserably departs for America on being invited by the medical association over there. Meanwhile, Seema tells Beena that she was looking at her marriage with Madhu just as a joke and that she has found the perfect life partner for her which turns out to be Dinesh. Beena agrees to Seema's advice and gets married to Dinesh. Seema also meets Pradeep officially for the first time in their marriage. Afterwards, Madhu arrives in India and Seema, Pradeep, Beena, and Dinesh come to pick him up at the airport. Over there, Madhu learns about Beena and Dinesh's marriage and believes that Seema and Pradeep are too married as they give him a bouquet together. Dejected, he throws the bouquet away and exits the airport. Seema stops him at the airport gate and confides in him that Pradeep is not related to her or their daughters at all. She explains to him that a man is cursed with lure while a woman is blessed with control and that is why their eternal bonds persist. Madhu apologises to Seema and the two restart their happy married life.

Cast 

 Mohan Joshi as Dr. Madhukar Hirve (Madhu)
 Neena Kulkarni as Seema Madhukar Hirve
 Varsha Usgaonkar as Dr. Beena Karnik / Dr. Beena Dinesh Kirtikar
 Prashant Damle as Dr. Dinesh Kirtikar (Madhu's colleague) 
 Ramesh Bhatkar as Pradeep Bhave (Madhu's friend)
 Amita Khopkar as Mrs.  Bendre (Seema's neighbour)
 Sudhir Joshi as Dadasaheb Hirve (Madhu's brother)
 Jaymala Inamdar as Narmada Dadasaheb Hirve (Madhu's sister-in-law)
 Shubhangi Damle as Mangala (Seema's neighbour)
 Anand Abhyankar as the doctor with Madhu at the conference

Crew
Director & Producer - Smita Talwalkar

References 

1993 films
1990s Marathi-language films